Salt tide is a phenomenon in which the lower course of a river, with its low altitude with respect to the sea level, becomes salty when the discharge of the river is low during dry season, usually worsened by the result of astronomical high tide. 

The lower course Xijiang (West River) in Guangdong, China was periodically affected and has been widely reported since 2004, for bringing shortage of fresh water supply to the western part of the Pearl River Delta. The salinity level of tap water at Zhuhai was reported to be as high as 800 mg per litre in late February 2006, more than 3 times higher than the World Health Organization standard of 250 mg.

References
"Fresh-water crisis looms for Macau - Salinity keeps rising despite assurances", South China Morning Post, Page A7 Hong Kong & Delta, published Thursday, February 23, 2006.

Hydrology
Rivers
Freshwater ecology